Pepper is a semi-humanoid robot manufactured by SoftBank Robotics (formerly Aldebaran Robotics), designed with the ability to read emotions. It was introduced in a conference on 5 June 2014, and was showcased in SoftBank Mobile phone stores in Japan beginning the next day. Pepper's ability to recognize emotion is based on detection and analysis of facial expressions and voice tones. Production of Pepper was paused in June 2021, due to weak demand.

History
Pepper was introduced in Tokyo on June 5, 2014, by Masayoshi Son, founder of SoftBank.

Pepper was scheduled to be available in December 2015 at SoftBank Mobile Pepper went on sale in June 2015 with the first batch of 1,000 units selling out in just 60 seconds.

Pepper was launched in the UK in 2016.

By May 2018, 12,000 Pepper robots had been sold in Europe.

In June 2021, it was reported SoftBank would pause production of Pepper, citing weak demand. At the time, an estimated 27,000 units had been manufactured.

Use

Commercial
Pepper is currently being used as a receptionist at several offices in the UK and is able to identify visitors with the use of facial recognition, send alerts for meeting organisers and arrange for drinks to be made. Pepper is able to chat autonomously to prospective clients. The first functioning Pepper receptionist in the UK was supplied by a SoftBank distributor and was installed in London at Brainlabs.

The robot has also been used at banks and medical facilities in Japan, using applications created by Seikatsu Kakumei. and it is also used in all branches of Hamazushi restaurants in Japan.

Pepper is being used in North American airports such as Pierre Elliott Trudeau International Airport in Montreal, Canada. The robot is used to greet travelers, offer menus and recommendations.

In 2018, Pepper robot was introduced first time in the UAE.

In December 2019, a dozen of Pepper robots were installed at the  "Pepper Parlor Café" in Tokyo, Japan.

Sports 
On 9 July 2020, a team of Pepper robots performed as cheerleaders at a baseball game between the Fukuoka SoftBank Hawks and the Rakuten Eagles, supported by a team of Boston Dynamics Spot quadrupedal robots.

Consumer
In 2017, Pepper was reported to have been used in thousands of homes in Japan.

Academic 
Pepper is available as a research and educational robot for schools, colleges and universities to teach programming and conduct research into human-robot interactions.

In 2017, an international team began research into using Pepper as versatile robot to help look after older people in care homes or sheltered accommodation. The project CARESSES aimed at developing the world's first culturally-competent robot, received funding worth more than two million Euros, with donors including the European Union and the Japanese government. The project was expected to run for three years. Institutions involved in the research include University of Genoa (Project Coordinator), Örebro University, Middlesex University, the University of Bedfordshire, SoftBank Robotics, Advinia HealthCare, Japan Advanced Institute of Science and Technology (Japanese coordinator), Nagoya University, Chubu University. On Tuesday 16 October 2018, a Pepper robot mentioned the CARESSES project while giving evidence to the Education Committee of the House of Commons of the United Kingdom Parliament.

Long-term research with Pepper could show that residents of care home are willing to interact with humanoid robots and benefit from cognitive and physical activation that is led by the robot Pepper. Another long-term study in a care home could show that people working in the care sector are willing to use robots in their daily work with the residents. But it also revealed that even though that the robots are ready to be used, they do need human assistants, they cannot replace the human work force but they can assist them and give them new possibilities.

Design

Purpose

Pepper is not a functional robot for domestic use.  Instead, Pepper is intended "to make people enjoy life", enhance people's lives, facilitate relationships, have fun with people and connect people with the outside world. Pepper's creators hope that independent developers will create new content and uses for Pepper.

Specifications
The robot's head has four microphones, two HD cameras (in the mouth and forehead), and a 3-D depth sensor (behind the eyes). There is a gyroscope in the torso and touch sensors in the head and hands. The mobile base has two sonars, six lasers, three bumper sensors, and a gyroscope.

It is able to run the existing content in the app store designed for SoftBank's Nao robot.

Incidents
In September 2015, a visitor frustrated with his customer experience in Tokyo lashed out against Pepper, damaging the unit.

In 2018, a supermarket in Edinburgh, Scotland removed the service robot within a week as it was unpopular with customers. This was said to be due to high levels of background noise making the robot unable to hear questions properly, and customers being unwilling to interact with a robot when human help was available.

See also 
 Manav (robot)
 Musio
 Nao

References

External links

 [https://www.softbankrobotics.com/us/pepper Pepper - SoftBank Robotics]
 Robot - SoftBank Group
 Pepper special website  
 Pepper developer website  

Robots of France
SoftBank Group
Humanoid robots
Robots of Japan
2014 introductions
2014 establishments in France
2014 establishments in Japan